Zeyva or Dzeyva or Zeyvə may refer to:

Places
Armenia
Aratashen
David Bek, Armenia
Taronik

Azerbaijan
Kələzeyvə
Zeyvə, Davachi
Zeyvə, Goranboy
Zeyvə, Ismailli
Zeyvə, Lachin
Zeyvə, Nakhchivan

Iran
Zaviyeh-ye Kord
Zaviyeh-ye Sadat
Zaviyeh, West Azerbaijan

See also
Zaviyeh (disambiguation)